The 2022 Trofeo de Campeones de la Liga Profesional (officially the Trofeo de Campeones Binance 2022 for sponsorship reasons) was the third edition of the Trofeo de Campeones de la Liga Profesional, an annual football match contested by the winners of Primera División and Copa de la Liga Profesional competitions, similar to the defunct Trofeo de Campeones de la Superliga Argentina.

As Boca Juniors won both championships, 2022 Primera División and 2022 Copa LPF, Racing and Tigre (runners-up of the aforementioned competitions) played a semi-final to define the rival of Boca Juniors. Racing defeated Tigre by a 3–2 score.

The final was played on 6 November 2022 at Estadio Único in Villa Mercedes, between Boca Juniors and Racing. Racing won their first title after the referee finished the match before the end of extra time after five Boca Juniors players had been sent off with Racing leading the score 2–1. The decision was taken according to the laws of the game, which rule that each team must have a minimum of seven players on field, otherwise the match can't be started or continued.

Qualified teams

Notes

Matches

Semi-final

Final
Marcos Rojo, Exequiel Zeballos (Boca Juniors), Emiliano Vecchio and Enzo Copetti (Racing) were ruled out of the final due to injuries. Edwin Cardona was excluded from Racing.

Finished because of laws of the game rule 3 infringement.

Statistics

References 

t
t
t
t